The Color Purple is a 1982 novel by Alice Walker.

The Color Purple may also refer to:
 The Color Purple (1985 film), a 1985 film directed by Steven Spielberg, based on the novel
 The Color Purple (musical), a 2005 musical based on the novel
 The Color Purple (2023 film), an upcoming film adaptation of the 2005 musical
 Be Range Arghavan, a 2010 Iranian film directed by Ebrahim Hatamikia

See also
Purple, a color